The Shire of Pingelly is a local government area in the Wheatbelt region of Western Australia, about  southeast of the state capital, Perth, between the Shires of Brookton and Cuballing along the Great Southern Highway.

History
On 24 December 1891, the Morambine Road District was created. On 21 February 1913, it was renamed the Pingelly Road District. On 1 July 1961, it became a Shire  following the passage of the Local Government Act 1960, which reformed all remaining road districts into shires.

Wards

From 20 October 2007, Pingelly is no longer divided into wards, and its 8 councillors represent the entire shire.

The ward systems created under successive divisions were as follows:

Towns and localities
The towns and localities of the Shire of Pingelly with population and size figures based on the most recent Australian census:

Former towns
 Dattening
 Kulyaling
 Moorumbine

Population

Notable councillors
 George Sewel, Pingelly Roads Board member 1904–1915, chairman 1914–1915; later a state MP

Heritage-listed places
As of 2023, 71 places are heritage-listed in the Shire of Pingelly, of which one is on the State Register of Heritage Places, the Pingelly Post Office. A second place on the register, the CBH Bins, Pingelly, was deregistered on 1 July 2021.

Formerly on the State Register of Heritage Places:

References

External links
 

 
Pingelly